The badminton men's singles tournament at the 1990 Asian Games in Beijing took place from 2 October to 6 October.

Schedule
All times are China Standard Time (UTC+08:00)

Results

Final

Top half

Bottom half

References
Results

Men's singles